Zavrate is a dispersed settlement in the Municipality of Radeče in eastern Slovenia. It lies in the hills above the right bank of the Sava River in the historical region of Lower Carniola. The municipality is now included in the Lower Sava Statistical Region; until January 2014 it was part of the Savinja Statistical Region.

History
Zavrate was formerly a hamlet of neighboring Podkraj. It was separated from Podkraj and made an independent settlement in 1986.

Cultural heritage
Archaeological evidence of a Roman settlement in the area indicates that the Romans built a bridge over the Sava River at its confluence with the Savinja.

References

External links
Zavrate at Geopedia

Populated places in the Municipality of Radeče